Dana Thomas Carvey (born June 2, 1955) is an American stand-up comedian, actor, impressionist, screenwriter, and producer. Carvey is best known for his seven seasons as a cast member on the NBC sketch comedy series Saturday Night Live from 1986 to 1993, which earned him five consecutive Primetime Emmy Award nominations.

Carvey is also known for his film roles in comedies such as Tough Guys (1986), Opportunity Knocks (1990), Trapped in Paradise (1994), and The Master of Disguise (2002), as well as reprising his role of Garth Algar in the SNL spin-off film Wayne's World (1992) and its sequel Wayne's World 2 (1993).

Early life
Carvey was born in Missoula, Montana, the fourth of five (with three older brothers and one younger sister) born to Billie Dahl, a schoolteacher, and William John (Bud) Carvey, a high school business teacher. Carvey is the brother of Brad Carvey, the engineer/designer of the Video Toaster. The character Garth Algar is loosely based on Brad. Carvey has English, German, Irish, Norwegian, and Swedish ancestry, and was raised Lutheran. 

In 1957, his family moved to Anderson, California, where his father got a teaching job. When he was three years old, his family moved to  San Carlos, California, in the San Francisco Bay Area. He attended Tierra Linda Junior High in San Carlos, Carlmont High School in Belmont, California (where he was a member of the Central Coast Section champion cross country team), College of San Mateo in San Mateo, California, and received his bachelor's degree in broadcast communications from San Francisco State University. In 1977, he won the San Francisco Stand-Up Comedy Competition.

Career

Early career
Carvey had a minor role in Halloween II in 1981, and co-starred in One of the Boys in 1982, a short-lived television sitcom that also starred Mickey Rooney, Nathan Lane, and Meg Ryan. In 1984, Carvey had a small role in Rob Reiner's film This Is Spinal Tap, in which he played a mime, with fellow comedian Billy Crystal (who tells him "Mime is money!"). He appeared in the music video for the Greg Kihn song "Lucky" in 1985. He also appeared in the short-lived film-based action television series Blue Thunder. His big break came in 1986, when he co-starred opposite Kirk Douglas and Burt Lancaster in Tough Guys. As a lifelong Douglas fan, Carvey threw in an affectionate impression of his mentor, while describing a hairy scene they did together on a moving train.

Carvey was a finalist for the hosting role on the Nickelodeon TV game show Double Dare. He ultimately withdrew his name from consideration after he was cast on Saturday Night Live. The job would go to Marc Summers.

Saturday Night Live
In 1986, Carvey became a household name when he joined the cast of NBC's Saturday Night Live. He, along with newcomers Phil Hartman, Kevin Nealon, Jan Hooks, and Victoria Jackson, helped to reverse the show's declining popularity and made SNL "must-see" TV once again. An important part of the show's revival was Carvey's breakout character, the Church Lady, the uptight, smug, and pious host of Church Chat. Carvey said he based the character on women he knew from church while growing up, who would keep track of other churchgoers' attendance. He became so associated with the character that later cast members such as Chris Farley referred to Carvey simply as "The Lady".

Carvey's other original characters included Garth Algar (from Wayne's World), who was based on his brother; Hans (from "Hans and Franz"); the Grumpy Old Man (from Weekend Update appearances); and Ching Chang, a Chinese poultry store owner. Throughout the election and presidency of George H. W. Bush, he was the designated impersonator of the president, making him the lead actor of the regular political sketches on SNL.

During the 1992 US presidential election campaign, Carvey also did an impression of independent candidate Ross Perot; in a prime-time special before the election, Carvey played both George H. W. Bush and Perot in a three-way debate with Bill Clinton, played by Phil Hartman. As Perot—recorded and timed to give the appearance of interacting with the live Bush and Clinton—Carvey eschewed the show's signature "Live from New York" opening line, telling Bush "Why don't you do it, live-boy?" Carvey left SNL in 1993.

In 1992, Carvey joined Mike Myers in Wayne's World, the film. A sequel, Wayne's World 2, was filmed and released in 1993.

Carvey's SNL work won him an Emmy Award in 1993 for Outstanding Individual Performance in a Variety or Music Program. He has a total of six Emmy nominations. Carvey has returned to host SNL four times, in 1994, 1996, 2000, and 2011 in addition to numerous cameo appearances.

After SNL
In 1994, Carvey starred in the film Clean Slate. The following year, Carvey filmed his first HBO stand-up special Critic's Choice. The show featured Carvey doing many of his SNL impersonations, as well as making fun of the premium channel's name, pronouncing it "hobo".

He had to turn down a role in Bad Boys because he felt overwhelmed as a new father.

He reprised many of his SNL characters in 1996 for The Dana Carvey Show, a short-lived prime-time variety show on ABC. The show was most notable for launching Robert Smigel's cartoon "The Ambiguously Gay Duo", as well as the careers of Steve Carell and Stephen Colbert.

In 2002, he returned to films in the spy comedy The Master of Disguise. Released a week after former colleague Mike Myers' successful film Austin Powers in Goldmember, most critics compared the movies and panned Carvey's effort. However, the movie did manage about $40 million at the North American box office. In March 2007, review aggregation website Rotten Tomatoes ranked the film as the 18th worst-reviewed movie of the 2000s decade, with an approval rating of 1% based on 103 reviews. Comedian and former Mystery Science Theater 3000 host Michael J. Nelson named the film the third-worst comedy ever made. Carvey did not appear in a film again until 2011's Jack and Jill. It, too, has been called one of the worst comedies of all time. He had previously appeared in another Adam Sandler film, Little Nicky.

In 2004, he ranked number 90 on Comedy Central's list of the 100 Greatest Stand-Ups of All Time.

After The Master of Disguise

Carvey eventually withdrew from the limelight to focus on his family. He later said in an interview that he did not want to be in a career in which his kids would already be grown with him having neglected spending time with them, a major reason for his declining the hosting spot for Late Night that ultimately went to Conan O'Brien. Carvey has said that he generally prefers stand-up comedy to acting in movies and regularly performs lucrative corporate dates, boasting of "a few million-dollar months" during a 2016 Howard Stern interview.

Carvey made an appearance at the 2008 MTV Movie Awards, reprising his SNL character Garth Algar with host Mike Myers for a "Wayne's World" sketch. On June 14, 2008, Carvey filmed a second HBO stand-up special, the first in 13 years, entitled Squatting Monkeys Tell No Lies.

In 2010, Carvey appeared in the Funny or Die original comedy sketch Presidential Reunion. He played the role of President George H. W. Bush alongside other current and former SNL president impersonators.

In early 2010, Carvey and comedian/writer Spike Feresten created and starred together in Spoof, a sketch comedy pilot for Fox. This included a sketch of a trailer for "Darwin", a mock film in which he played the evolutionary biologist, as well as a spoof of the hit TV series Lost. Both of these sketches can be seen on YouTube. On the animated TV series The Fairly OddParents, Carvey voiced Cosmo Cosma's con artist brother Schnozmo.

On April 29 and 30, 2016, Carvey recorded two live performances at the Wilbur Theatre in Boston, Massachusetts for a Netflix special released later in the year. His two sons, Tom and Dex, opened the show for him.

Carvey was a guest on Conan O'Brien's podcast, Conan O'Brien Needs a Friend, on January 27, 2019. Carvey was subsequently featured in a six episode mini-series of the podcast titled "Deep Dive with Dana Carvey", released in August 2019.

Carvey has regularly done sketch impressions on The Late Show with Stephen Colbert playing, among others, President Joe Biden and former national security advisor John Bolton. 

On August 1, 2019, Carvey appeared on the guest panel of the fourth episode of Lights Out with David Spade and also in costume as Tony Montana in a number of later episodes.

In 2021, Carvey began hosting the comedy podcast "Fantastic! with Dana Carvey". The podcast features mini sketches involving Carvey's many celebrity impressions, as well as interview segments with Carvey's family members and other friends from the stand-up comedy world. That same year, Carvey reprised his role of Garth Algar alongside Myers' Wayne Campbell in a series of commercials for Uber Eats. The original spot first ran during Super Bowl LV.

In 2022, Carvey began co-hosting the Fly on the Wall podcast with fellow Saturday Night Live alum David Spade. Guests include former cast members and hosts of SNL.

Personal life
In 1979, childhood sweethearts Leah and Dana Carvey were married. During his marriage, while performing at The Other Cafe in San Francisco, Carvey met and became romantically involved with Paula Zwagerman. Subsequently, Leah and Dana divorced in 1980. Dana and Paula became engaged in 1981 and married in 1983. The couple have two children, Dex, born 1992, and Thomas, born 1994.

In 1995, Carvey had a home in the San Fernando Valley, and his parents relocated to Murrieta, California to be near Billie's sister, Shirley Miller. 

In 1997, Carvey underwent heart bypass surgery for a blocked coronary artery. The artery was buried deep in myocardium and difficult to find; the surgeon mistakenly performed the bypass on another accessible artery that was unblocked. As a result, Carvey continued to suffer from angina pectoris and successfully sued for $7.5 million in damages, which he donated to charity; he later underwent additional corrective surgery. He told Newsday that, while he was in the hospital for his final angioplasty, Frank Sinatra died in the room adjacent to his.  In the late 1990s, Carvey took a break to raise his two sons.

Carvey and his family live in Mill Valley in Marin County, California.

Filmography

Film

Television

References

External links

 
 
 
 
 
 

1955 births
20th-century American comedians
21st-century American comedians
20th-century American male actors
21st-century American male actors
American impressionists (entertainers)
American Lutherans
American male comedians
American male film actors
American male television actors
American people of English descent
American people of German descent
American people of Irish descent
American people of Norwegian descent
American people of Swedish descent
American sketch comedians
American stand-up comedians
American television writers
College of San Mateo alumni
Living people
Male actors from California
Male actors from Montana
American male television writers
People from Belmont, California
People from Mill Valley, California
People from San Carlos, California
People from Missoula, Montana
Primetime Emmy Award winners
San Francisco State University alumni
Screenwriters from California
Screenwriters from Montana
Comedians from Montana
Comedians from California
Comedians from New York (state)